The 2008 Missouri Valley Conference men's soccer season was the 18th season of men's varsity soccer in the conference.

The 2008 Missouri Valley Conference Men's Soccer Tournament was hosted by Evansville and won by Creighton.

Teams

MVC Tournament

See also 

 Missouri Valley Conference
 Missouri Valley Conference men's soccer tournament
 2008 NCAA Division I men's soccer season
 2008 in American soccer

References 

Missouri Valley Conference
2008 NCAA Division I men's soccer season